Saad Abdel-Salam al-Nayef is the Minister of Health of Syria since August 25, 2012 when he was sworn in by Syrian President Bashar al-Assad. He was appointed to the position after his predecessor, Wael Nader Al-Halqi, was appointed Prime Minister on 9 August 2012.

Sanctions
On May 16, 2013, the United States Treasury Department designated four senior Syrian officials, including al-Nayef, for "backing the government of Bashar Al-Assad in suppressing people or involvement in terrorism".

See also
Cabinet of Syria

References

Living people
People of the Syrian civil war
Year of birth missing (living people)
21st-century Syrian politicians
Syrian ministers of health
Syrian Muslims